Saurode is a small river of Hesse, Germany. It flows into the Gresel in Fulda-Zell.

See also
List of rivers of Hesse

Rivers of Hesse
Rivers of Germany

de:Saurode